Percier and Fontaine was a noted partnership between French architects Charles Percier and Pierre François Léonard Fontaine.

History
Together, Percier and Fontaine were inventors and major proponents of the rich and grand, consciously archaeological versions of early 19th-century Neoclassical architecture known as Directoire style and Empire style.

Following Charles Percier's death in 1838, Fontaine designed a tomb in their characteristic style in the Pere Lachaise Cemetery. Percier and Fontaine had lived together as well as being colleagues.

Fontaine married late in life and after his death in 1853 his wife placed his body in the same tomb according to his wishes.

References

Further reading
Charles Percier, Pierre François Léonard Fontaine (2018): The Complete Works of Percier and Fontaine. New York, Princeton Architectural Press, 2018, .

19th-century French architects
French neoclassical architects